Chassang is a surname. Notable people with the surname include:

Alexis Chassang (1827–1888), French translator
Jean Chassang (born 1951), French cyclist
Pierre Chassang (1919–2013), French aikidoka